Akuşapeştə (also, Aquşapeştə and Agoshapeshta) is a village in the Lerik Rayon of Azerbaijan. The village forms part of the municipality of Siyov.

References 

Populated places in Lerik District